Your New Favourite Band is a collection by The Hives released in 2001, featuring tracks from their first two albums and the A.K.A. I-D-I-O-T  EP. It was released by Alan McGee's Poptones record label, which was licensed the band's songs by Burning Heart Records. The decision to release such a compilation was made with the intention of achieving mainstream success in the UK and other territories. The album was featured in the book 1001 Albums You Must Hear Before You Die.

Track listing
"Hate to Say I Told You So" – 3:22
"Main Offender" – 2:33
"Supply and Demand" – 2:26
"Die, All Right!" – 2:45
"Untutored Youth" – 1:34
"Outsmarted" – 2:21
"Mad Man" – 2:29
"Here We Go Again" – 2:12
"A.K.A. I-D-I-O-T" – 2:11
"Automatic Schmuck" – 2:17
"Hail Hail Spit N' Drool" – 1:26
"The Hives Are Law, You Are Crime" – 2:31

Some pressings of the album also contained videos for "Hate to Say I Told You So", "Main Offender", "Die, All Right!" and previously-unreleased video "A.K.A. I-D-I-O-T".

Charts

Weekly charts

Year-end charts

References

The Hives albums
2001 compilation albums
Burning Heart Records compilation albums
Reprise Records compilation albums
Sire Records compilation albums